Vojtech Varadin  (27 September 1948 – 25 August 2018) was a Slovak football player. He earned 5 caps for the Czechoslovakia national football team. He Played for FC Spartak Trnava and ŠK Slovan Bratislava.

International career
Varadin made five appearances for the full Czechoslovakia national football team.

References

1948 births
2018 deaths
Slovak footballers
Czechoslovak footballers
Czechoslovakia international footballers
FC Spartak Trnava players
ŠK Slovan Bratislava players
Sportspeople from Trnava
Association football defenders